In five-dimensional geometry, a rectified 5-cube is a convex uniform 5-polytope, being a rectification of the regular 5-cube.

There are 5 degrees of rectifications of a 5-polytope, the zeroth here being the 5-cube, and the 4th and last being the 5-orthoplex. Vertices of the rectified 5-cube are located at the edge-centers of the 5-cube. Vertices of the birectified 5-cube are located in the square face centers of the 5-cube.

Rectified 5-cube

Alternate names
 Rectified penteract (acronym: rin) (Jonathan Bowers)

Construction 
The rectified 5-cube may be constructed from the 5-cube by truncating its vertices at the midpoints of its edges.

Coordinates
The Cartesian coordinates of the vertices of the rectified 5-cube with edge length  is given by all permutations of:

Images

Birectified 5-cube

E. L. Elte identified it in 1912 as a semiregular polytope, identifying it as Cr52 as a second rectification of a 5-dimensional cross polytope.

Alternate names
 Birectified 5-cube/penteract
 Birectified pentacross/5-orthoplex/triacontiditeron
 Penteractitriacontiditeron (acronym: nit) (Jonathan Bowers)
 Rectified 5-demicube/demipenteract

Construction and coordinates

The Cartesian coordinates of the vertices of a birectified 5-cube having edge length 2 are all permutations of:

Images

Related polytopes

Related polytopes

These polytopes are a part of 31 uniform polytera generated from the regular 5-cube or 5-orthoplex.

Notes

References 
 H.S.M. Coxeter: 
 H.S.M. Coxeter, Regular Polytopes, 3rd Edition, Dover New York, 1973 
 Kaleidoscopes: Selected Writings of H.S.M. Coxeter, edited by F. Arthur Sherk, Peter McMullen, Anthony C. Thompson, Asia Ivic Weiss, Wiley-Interscience Publication, 1995,  
 (Paper 22) H.S.M. Coxeter, Regular and Semi Regular Polytopes I, [Math. Zeit. 46 (1940) 380-407, MR 2,10]
 (Paper 23) H.S.M. Coxeter, Regular and Semi-Regular Polytopes II, [Math. Zeit. 188 (1985) 559-591]
 (Paper 24) H.S.M. Coxeter, Regular and Semi-Regular Polytopes III, [Math. Zeit. 200 (1988) 3-45]
 Norman Johnson Uniform Polytopes, Manuscript (1991)
 N.W. Johnson: The Theory of Uniform Polytopes and Honeycombs, Ph.D. 
  o3x3o3o4o - rin, o3o3x3o4o - nit

External links 
 Polytopes of Various Dimensions
 Multi-dimensional Glossary

5-polytopes